Spacefarers is a 1981 board game published by Games Workshop.

Gameplay
Spacefarers is a set of miniature rules designed specifically to be used with the Spacefarers figures from Citadel Miniatures.

Reception
William A. Barton reviewed Spacefarers in The Space Gamer No. 46. Barton commented that "If you enjoy SF miniature skirmishes - and especially if you own Spacefarers figures - Spacefarers should prove of interest to you."

External links

References

Board games introduced in 1981
Games Workshop games